The 2012–13 Charleston Southern Buccaneers men's basketball team represented Charleston Southern University during the 2012–13 NCAA Division I men's basketball season. The Buccaneers, led by eighth year head coach Barclay Radebaugh, played their home games at the CSU Field House and were members of the South Division of the Big South Conference. 19–13, 12–4 in Big South play to be champions of the South Division. They advanced to the championship game of the Big South tournament where they lost to Liberty. As a conference champion, they earned an automatic bid to the 2013 NIT where they lost in the first round to Southern Miss.

Roster

Schedule

|-
!colspan=9| Regular season

|-
!colspan=9| 2013 Big South tournament

|-
!colspan=9| 2013 NIT

References

Charleston Southern Buccaneers men's basketball seasons
Charleston Southern
Charleston Southern
Charleston Southern Buc
Charleston Southern Buc